XHVO-FM is a radio station on 94.3 FM in San Rafael, Veracruz, known as La Mega.

History
XEVO-AM 1520 received its concession on June 22, 1970. It was a 250-watt daytimer owned by Manuel Bernal Mejía. In the 2000s, it increased power to 1,000 watts and began broadcasting at night with 1,000 watts.

XEVO moved to FM in 2010 as XHVO-FM 94.3.

References

External links
La Mega 94.3 Twitter

Radio stations in Veracruz
Radio stations established in 1970